C'est l'temps was a Franco-Ontarian civil disobedience movement in the mid-to-late-1970s over the lack of Ontario government services in French. Over two dozen people were arrested, as activists monopolised police time on trivial traffic infractions, refused to pay fines, and sabotaged computer systems.

The movement led to a significant increase in French-language service accessibility and the Ontario justice system becoming officially bilingual in 1984 and then the French Language Services Act in 1986.

Background 

In 1967, Ontario Premier John Robarts pledged to offer services in French following the Royal Commission on Bilingualism and Biculturalism, however, by the early 70s, and despite Robarts' successor Bill Davis, almost no progress had been made on the issue.

At the same time, the separatist movement was gaining momentum in Québec, and regional French-Canadian identities began to assert their individuality.

Goals 

The movement made six key demands:

 An end to unilingual arrests and fines
 An end to unilingual licence plates
 Bilingual judicial forms
 Bilingual driver's licences
 Bilingual trials
 Bilingual municipal regulations

References

Archives 
Centre de recherche en civilisation canadienne-française

Political movements in Canada
Franco-Ontarian organizations
Bilingualism in Canada
Protests in Canada
Franco-Ontarian history